The Anglican Diocese of Ogoni is one of ten within the Anglican Province of the Niger Delta, itself one of 14 provinces within the Church of Nigeria. The current bishop is Solomon Gberegbara. Gberegbara was consecrated a bishop on March 13, 2005 at the Cathedral Church of the Advent,
Abuja; and the missionary diocese was inaugurated on March 16 at All Saints' Cathedral, Bori.

Notes

Church of Nigeria dioceses
Dioceses of the Province of Niger Delta